The yellow-throated tanager (Iridosornis analis) is a species of bird in the family Thraupidae.
It is found in Colombia, Ecuador, and Peru.
Its natural habitat is subtropical or tropical moist montane forests.

References

yellow-throated tanager
Birds of the Ecuadorian Andes
Birds of the Peruvian Andes
yellow-throated tanager
Taxonomy articles created by Polbot